is a 1970 Japanese comedy film directed by Shun'ichi Kobayashi. It stars Kiyoshi Atsumi as Kuruma Torajirō (Tora-san), and Komaki Kurihara as his love interest or "Madonna". Tora-san's Grand Scheme is the fourth entry in the popular, long-running Otoko wa Tsurai yo series.

Synopsis
Hoping to repay his family for the trouble he has caused them in the past, Torasan gambles and wins at the horse races. He plans to give his uncle and aunt a vacation in Hawaii, but the travel agent turns out to be a con-artist, and makes off with his money. Torasan falls in love with Haruko, a young kindergarten teacher who is renting a room in his uncle's home.

Cast
 Kiyoshi Atsumi as Torajiro
 Chieko Baisho as Sakura
 Komaki Kurihara as Haruko
 Chieko Misaki as Tsune Kuruma (Torajiro's aunt)
 Gin Maeda as Hiroshi Suwa
 Masaaki Tsusaka as Noboru Kawamata
 Gajirō Satō as Genkichi (Man at the Temple)

Critical appraisal
The German-language site molodezhnaja gives Tora-san's Grand Scheme three out of five stars.

Availability
Tora-san's Grand Scheme was released theatrically on February 27, 1970. In Japan, the film was released on videotape in 1989 and 1995, and in DVD format in 2000, 2005, and 2008. AnimEigo released the film on DVD in the US along with the other first four films in the Otoko wa Tsurai yo series on November 24, 2009.

References

Bibliography

English

German

Japanese

External links
 Tora-san's Grand Scheme at www.tora-san.jp (official site)

1970 films
Films set in Nagoya
1970s Japanese-language films
Otoko wa Tsurai yo films
Japanese sequel films
Shochiku films
1970 comedy films
1970s Japanese films